Scott R. Lewis is an American sound engineer. He was nominated for five Primetime Emmy Awards in the category Outstanding Sound Mixing. Lewis also won an Primetime Emmy Award for his work on the political thriller television series House of Cards in 2014. His win was shared with Lorenzo Millan and Nathan Nance.

References

External links 

Living people
Place of birth missing (living people)
Year of birth missing (living people)
American audio engineers
21st-century American engineers
Primetime Emmy Award winners